ASAC may refer to:

 Administrative Sciences Association of Canada; see Canadian Journal of Administrative Sciences
 ASAC Concorde, a Mauritanean football club
 Airborne Surveillance And Control, a version of the Westland Sea King helicopter
 Assistant Special Agent in Charge
 Austrian Society of Analytical Chemistry, the society behind the Fritz Feigl Prize